

Events

Pre-1600
 392 – Arbogast has Eugenius elected Western Roman Emperor.
 851 – Battle of Jengland: Erispoe defeats Charles the Bald near the Breton town of Jengland.
1138 – Battle of the Standard between Scotland and England.
1485 – The Battle of Bosworth Field occurs; Richard III dies, marking the end of the House of Plantagenet.
1559 – Spanish archbishop Bartolomé Carranza is arrested for heresy.

1601–1900
1614 – Fettmilch Uprising: Jews are expelled from Frankfurt, Holy Roman Empire, following the plundering of the Judengasse.
1639 – Madras (now Chennai), India, is founded by the British East India Company on a sliver of land bought from local Nayak rulers.
1642 – Charles I raises his standard in Nottingham, which marks the beginning of the English Civil War.
1654 – Jacob Barsimson arrives in New Amsterdam. He is the first known Jewish immigrant to America.
1711 – Britain's Quebec Expedition loses eight ships and almost nine hundred soldiers, sailors and women to rocks at Pointe-aux-Anglais.
1717 – Spanish troops land on Sardinia.
1770 – James Cook names and lands on Possession Island, and claims the east coast of Australia for Britain as New South Wales.
1777 – British forces abandon the Siege of Fort Stanwix after hearing rumors of Continental Army reinforcements.
1780 – James Cook's ship  returns to England (Cook having been killed on Hawaii during the voyage).
1791 – The Haitian slave revolution begins in Saint-Domingue, Haiti.
1798 – French troops land at Kilcummin, County Mayo, Ireland to aid the rebellion.
1827 – José de la Mar becomes President of Peru.
1846 – The Second Federal Republic of Mexico is established.
1849 – The first air raid in history occurs; Austria launches pilotless balloons against the city of Venice.
  1849   – Passaleão incident: João Maria Ferreira do Amaral, the governor of Portuguese Macau, is assassinated by a group of Chinese locals, triggering a military confrontation between China and Portugal at the Battle of Passaleão three days after.
1851 – The first America's Cup is won by the yacht America.
1864 – Twelve nations sign the First Geneva Convention, establishing the rules of protection of the victims of armed conflicts.
1875 – The Treaty of Saint Petersburg between Japan and Russia is ratified, providing for the exchange of Sakhalin for the Kuril Islands.
1894 – Mahatma Gandhi forms the Natal Indian Congress (NIC) in order to fight discrimination against Indian traders in Natal.

1901–present
1902 – The Cadillac Motor Company is founded.
  1902   – Theodore Roosevelt becomes the first President of the United States to make a public appearance in an automobile.
  1902   – At least 6,000 people are killed by the magnitude 7.7 Kashgar earthquake in the Tien Shan mountains.
1922 – Michael Collins, Commander-in-chief of the Irish Free State Army, is shot dead in an ambush during the Irish Civil War.
1934 – Bill Woodfull of Australia becomes the only test cricket captain to twice regain The Ashes.
1941 – World War II: German troops begin the Siege of Leningrad.
1942 – Brazil declares war on Germany, Japan and Italy.
1944 – World War II: Holocaust of Kedros in Crete by German forces.
1949 – The Queen Charlotte earthquake is Canada's strongest since the 1700 Cascadia earthquake.
1953 – The penal colony on Devil's Island is permanently closed.
1962 – The OAS attempts to assassinate French president Charles de Gaulle.
1963 – X-15 Flight 91 reaches the highest altitude of the X-15 program ( (354,200 feet)).
1966 – Labor movements NFWA and AWOC merge to become the United Farm Workers Organizing Committee (UFWOC), the predecessor of the United Farm Workers.
1968 – Pope Paul VI arrives in Bogotá, Colombia. It is the first visit of a pope to Latin America.
1971 – J. Edgar Hoover and John Mitchell announce the arrest of 20 of the Camden 28.
1972 – Rhodesia is expelled by the IOC for its racist policies.
1973 – The Congress of Chile votes in favour of a resolution condemning President Salvador Allende's government and demands that he resign or else be unseated through force and new elections.
1978 – Nicaraguan Revolution: The FLSN seizes the National Congress of Nicaragua, along with over a thousand hostages.
  1978   – The District of Columbia Voting Rights Amendment is passed by the U.S. Congress, although it is never ratified by a sufficient number of states.
1981 – Far Eastern Air Transport Flight 103 disintegrates in mid-air and crashes in Sanyi Township, Miaoli County, Taiwan. All 110 people on board are killed.
1985 – British Airtours Flight 28M suffers an engine fire during takeoff at Manchester Airport. The pilots abort but due to inefficient evacuation procedures 55 people are killed, mostly from smoke inhalation.
1989 – Nolan Ryan strikes out Rickey Henderson to become the first Major League Baseball pitcher to record 5,000 strikeouts.
1991 – Iceland is the first nation in the world to recognize the independence of the Baltic states.
1992 – FBI sniper Lon Horiuchi shoots and kills Vicki Weaver during an 11-day siege at her home at Ruby Ridge, Idaho.
1999 – China Airlines Flight 642 crashes at Hong Kong International Airport, killing three people and injuring 208 more.
2003 – Alabama Chief Justice Roy Moore is suspended after refusing to comply with a federal court order to remove a rock inscribed with the Ten Commandments from the lobby of the Alabama Supreme Court building.
2004 – Versions of The Scream and Madonna, two paintings by Edvard Munch, are stolen at gunpoint from a museum in Oslo, Norway.
2006 – Pulkovo Aviation Enterprise Flight 612 crashes near the Russian border over eastern Ukraine, killing all 170 people on board.
  2006   – Grigori Perelman is awarded the Fields Medal for his proof of the Poincaré conjecture in mathematics but refuses to accept the medal.
2007 – The Texas Rangers defeat the Baltimore Orioles 30–3, the most runs scored by a team in modern Major League Baseball history.
2012 – Ethnic clashes over grazing rights for cattle in Kenya's Tana River District result in more than 52 deaths.

Births

Pre-1600
1412 – Frederick II, Elector of Saxony (d. 1464)
1570 – Franz von Dietrichstein, Roman Catholic archbishop and cardinal (d. 1636)
1599 – Agatha Marie of Hanau, German noblewoman (d. 1636)

1601–1900
1601 – Georges de Scudéry, French author, poet, and playwright (d. 1667)
1624 – Jean Regnault de Segrais, French author and poet (d. 1701)
1647 – Denis Papin, French physicist and mathematician, developed pressure cooking (d. 1712)
1679 – Pierre Guérin de Tencin, French cardinal (d. 1758)
1760 – Pope Leo XII (d. 1829)
1764 – Charles Percier, French architect and interior designer (d. 1838)
1771 – Henry Maudslay, English engineer (d. 1831)
1773 – Aimé Bonpland, French botanist and explorer (d. 1858)
1778 – James Kirke Paulding, American poet, playwright, and politician, 11th United States Secretary of the Navy (d. 1860)
1800 – Samuel David Luzzatto, Italian poet and scholar (d. 1865)
1818 – Rudolf von Jhering, German jurist (d. 1892)
1827 – Ezra Butler Eddy, Canadian businessman and politician (d. 1906)
1834 – Samuel Pierpont Langley, American physicist and astronomer (d. 1906)
1836 – Archibald Willard, American soldier and painter (d. 1918)
1844 – George W. De Long, American Naval officer and explorer (d. 1881)
1845 – William Lewis Douglas, American businessman and politician, 42nd Governor of Massachusetts (d. 1924)
1847 – John Forrest, Australian politician, 1st Premier of Western Australia (d. 1918)
1848 – Melville Elijah Stone, American publisher, founded the Chicago Daily News (d. 1929)
1854 – Milan I of Serbia (d. 1901)
1857 – Ned Hanlon, American baseball player and manager (d. 1937)
1860 – Paul Gottlieb Nipkow, Polish-German technician and inventor, created the Nipkow disk (d. 1940)
  1860   – Alfred Ploetz, German physician, biologist, and eugenicist (d. 1940)
1862 – Claude Debussy, French pianist and composer (d. 1918)
1867 – Maximilian Bircher-Benner, Swiss physician and nutritionist (d. 1939)
  1867   – Charles Francis Jenkins, American inventor (d. 1934)
1868 – Willis R. Whitney, American chemist (d. 1958)
1873 – Alexander Bogdanov, Russian physician and philosopher (d. 1928)
1874 – Max Scheler, German philosopher and author (d. 1928)
1880 – Gorch Fock, German author and poet (d. 1916)
  1880   – George Herriman, American cartoonist (d. 1944)
1881 – James Newland, Australian soldier and policeman (d. 1949)
1882 – Raymonde de Laroche, French pilot (d. 1919)
1887 – Lutz Graf Schwerin von Krosigk, German jurist and politician, German Minister of Foreign Affairs (d. 1977)
1890 – Cecil Kellaway, South African actor (d. 1973)
1891 – Henry Bachtold, Australian soldier and railway engineer (d. 1983)
  1891   – Jacques Lipchitz, Lithuanian-Italian sculptor (d. 1973)
1893 – Wilfred Kitching, English 7th General of The Salvation Army (d. 1977)
  1893   – Dorothy Parker, American poet, short story writer, critic, and satirist (d. 1967)
  1893   – Ernest H. Volwiler, American chemist (d. 1992)
1895 – László Almásy, Hungarian captain, pilot, and explorer (d. 1951)
  1895   – Paul Comtois, Canadian lawyer and politician, 21st Lieutenant Governor of Quebec (d. 1966)
1896 – Laurence McKinley Gould, American geologist, educator, and polar explorer (d. 1995)
1897 – Bill Woodfull, Australian cricketer and educator (d. 1965)
1900 – Lisy Fischer, Swiss-born pianist and child prodigy (d. 1999)

1901–present
1902 – Thomas Pelly, American lawyer and politician (d. 1973)
  1902   – Leni Riefenstahl, German actress, film director and propagandist (d. 2003)
  1902   – Edward Rowe Snow, American historian and author (d. 1982)
1903 – Jerry Iger, American cartoonist, co-founded Eisner & Iger (d. 1990)
1904 – Deng Xiaoping, Chinese soldier and politician, 1st Vice Premier of the People's Republic of China (d. 1997)
1908 – Henri Cartier-Bresson, French photographer and painter (d. 2004)
  1908   – Erwin Thiesies, German rugby player and coach (d. 1993)
1909 – Julius J. Epstein, American screenwriter and producer (d. 2000)
  1909   – Mel Hein, American football player and coach (d. 1992)
1913 – Leonard Pagliero, English businessman and pilot (d. 2008)
  1913   – Bruno Pontecorvo, Italian physicist and academic (d. 1993)
1914 – Jack Dunphy, American author and playwright (d. 1992)
  1914   – Connie B. Gay, American businessman, co-founded the Country Music Hall of Fame and Museum (d. 1989)
1915 – David Dellinger, American activist (d. 2004)
  1915   – James Hillier, Canadian-American scientist, co-designed the electron microscope (d. 2007)
  1915   – Edward Szczepanik, Polish economist and politician, 15th Prime Minister of the Polish Republic in Exile (d. 2005)
1917 – John Lee Hooker, American singer-songwriter and guitarist (d. 2001)
1918 – Mary McGrory, American journalist and author (d. 2004)
1920 – Ray Bradbury, American science fiction writer and screenwriter (d. 2012)
  1920   – Denton Cooley, American surgeon and scientist (d. 2016)
1921 – Dinos Dimopoulos, Greek director and screenwriter (d. 2003)
  1921   – Tony Pawson, English cricketer, footballer, and journalist (d. 2012)
1922 – Roberto Aizenberg, Argentine painter and sculptor (d. 1996)
  1922   – Theoni V. Aldredge, Greek-American costume designer (d. 2011)
1924 – James Kirkwood, Jr., American playwright and author (d. 1989)
  1924   – Harishankar Parsai, Indian writer, satirist and humorist (d. 1995)
1925 – Honor Blackman, English actress and republican (d. 2020)
1926 – Bob Flanigan, American pop singer (d. 2011)
1928 – Tinga Seisay, Sierra Leonean academic and diplomat (d.2015)
  1928   – Karlheinz Stockhausen, German composer and academic (d. 2007)
1929 – Valery Alekseyev, Russian anthropologist and author (d. 1991)
  1929   – Ulrich Wegener, German police officer and general (d. 2017)
1930 – Gylmar dos Santos Neves, Brazilian footballer (d. 2013)
1932 – Gerald P. Carr, American engineer, colonel, and astronaut (d. 2020)
1933 – Sylva Koscina, Italian actress (d. 1994)
1934 – Norman Schwarzkopf, Jr., American general and engineer (d. 2012)
1935 – Annie Proulx, American novelist, short story writer, and journalist
1936 – Chuck Brown, American singer-songwriter, guitarist, and producer (d. 2012)
  1936   – John Callaway, American journalist and producer (d. 2009)
  1936   – Dale Hawkins, American singer-songwriter and guitarist (d. 2010)
  1936   – Werner Stengel, German roller coaster designer and engineer, designed the Maverick roller coaster
1938 – Jean Berkey, American businesswoman and politician (d. 2013)
1939 – Valerie Harper, American actress (d. 2019)
1941 – Bill Parcells, American football player and coach
1943 – Alun Michael, Welsh police commissioner and politician, inaugural First Minister of Wales
  1943   – Masatoshi Shima, Japanese computer scientist and engineer, co-designed the Intel 4004
1944 – Roger Cashmore, English physicist and academic
1945 – Ron Dante, American singer-songwriter and producer 
1947 – Cindy Williams, American actress and producer
1948 – David Marks, American singer-songwriter and guitarist 
1950 – Ray Burris, American baseball player and coach
  1950   – Scooter Libby, American lawyer and politician, Chief of Staff to the Vice President of the United States
1952 – Peter Laughner, American singer-songwriter and guitarist (d. 1977)
1953 – Paul Ellering, American weightlifter, wrestler, and manager
1955 – Chiranjeevi, Indian film actor, producer and politician
1956 – Paul Molitor, American baseball player and coach
  1956   – Peter Taylor, Australian cricketer
1957 – Steve Davis, English snooker player, sportscaster, and author
  1957   – Holly Dunn, American country music singer-songwriter (d. 2016)
1958 – Colm Feore, American-Canadian actor
  1958   – Stevie Ray, American semi-retired wrestler
  1958   – Vernon Reid, English-born American guitarist and songwriter
1959 – Juan Croucier, Cuban-American singer-songwriter, bass player, and producer 
  1959   – Pia Gjellerup, Danish lawyer and politician, Danish Minister of Finance
  1959   – Mark Williams, English actor
1960 – Holger Gehrke, German footballer and manager
  1960   – Collin Raye, American country music singer 
1961 – Andrés Calamaro, Argentine singer-songwriter, guitarist, and producer 
  1961   – Debbi Peterson, American singer-songwriter and drummer
1962 – Stefano Tilli, Italian sprinter
1963 – Tori Amos, American singer-songwriter, pianist, and producer 
  1963   – James DeBarge, American R&B/soul singer
  1963   – Terry Catledge, American basketball player
1964 – Trey Gowdy, American lawyer and U.S. Representative
  1964   – Mats Wilander, Swedish-American tennis player and coach
1965 – Wendy Botha, South African-Australian surfer
  1965   – David Reimer, Canadian man, born male but reassigned female and raised as a girl after a botched circumcision (d. 2004)
1966 – GZA, American rapper and producer
  1966   – Rob Witschge, Dutch footballer and manager
1967 – Ty Burrell, American actor and comedian
  1967   – Paul Colman, Australian singer-songwriter and guitarist 
  1967   – Alfred Gough, American screenwriter and producer
  1967   – Layne Staley, American singer-songwriter (d. 2002)
1968 – Casper Christensen, Danish comedian, actor, and screenwriter
  1968   – Rich Lowry, American writer and magazine editor (National Review)
  1968   – Aleksandr Mostovoi, Russian footballer
  1968   – Elisabeth Murdoch, Australian businesswoman
  1968   – Horst Skoff, Austrian tennis player (d. 2008)
1970 – Charlie Connelly, English author and broadcaster
  1970   – Giada De Laurentiis, Italian-American chef and author
  1970   – Tímea Nagy, Hungarian fencer
1971 – Craig Finn, American singer-songwriter and guitarist 
1972 – Okkert Brits, South African pole vaulter
  1972   – Paul Doucette, American singer-songwriter, guitarist, and drummer 
  1972   – Steve Kline, American baseball player and coach
  1972   – Max Wilson, German-Brazilian race car driver
1973 – Roslina Bakar, Malaysian sport shooter
  1973   – Howie Dorough, American singer-songwriter and dancer
  1973   – Kristen Wiig, American actress, comedian, and screenwriter
  1973   – Eurelijus Žukauskas, Lithuanian basketball player
1974 – Cory Gardner, American politician
  1974   – Agustín Pichot, Argentinian rugby player
1975 – Clint Bolton, Australian footballer
  1975   – Rodrigo Santoro, Brazilian actor
1976 – Marius Bezykornovas, Lithuanian footballer
  1976   – Bryn Davies, American bassist, cellist, and pianist
  1976   – Laurent Hernu, French decathlete
  1976   – Randy Wolf, American baseball player
1977 – Heiðar Helguson, Icelandic footballer
  1977   – Keren Cytter, Israeli visual artist and writer
1978 – James Corden, English actor, comedian, writer, and television presenter 
  1978   – Ioannis Gagaloudis, Greek basketball player
1979 – Matt Walters, American football player
1980 – Roland Benschneider, German footballer
  1980   – Nicolas Macrozonaris, Canadian sprinter
  1980   – Seiko Yamamoto, Japanese wrestler
1981 – Alex Holmes, American football player
  1981   – Jang Hyun-kyu, South Korean footballer (d. 2012)
  1981   – Christina Obergföll, German athlete
1983 – Theo Bos, Dutch cyclist
  1983   – Jahri Evans, American football player
1984 – Lee Camp, English footballer
  1984   – Lawrence Quaye, Ghanaian-Qatari footballer
1985 – Luke Russert, American journalist
  1985   – Jey Uso, Samoan-American wrestler
  1985   – Jimmy Uso, Samoan-American wrestler 
  1985   – Salih Yoluç, Turkish Automobile Racer
1986 – Stephen Ireland, Irish footballer
  1986   – Benjamin Satterley, English wrestler
  1986   – Tokushōryū Makoto, Japanese sumo wrestler
1987 – Leonardo Moracci, Italian footballer
  1987   – Apollo Crews, American wrestler
1989 – Giacomo Bonaventura, Italian footballer
1990 – Randall Cobb, American football player
  1990   – Drew Hutchison, American baseball player
  1990   – Robbie Rochow, Australian rugby league player
1991 – Federico Macheda, Italian footballer
  1991   – Brayden Schenn, Canadian ice hockey player
1992 – Ema Burgić Bucko, Bosnian tennis player
1994 – Olli Määttä, Finnish ice hockey player
1995 – Dua Lipa, English singer-songwriter
1996 – Jessica-Jane Applegate, British Paralympic swimmer
  1996   – Jeon So-min, South Korean singer-songwriter
1997 – Lautaro Martínez, Argentina footballer

Deaths

Pre-1600
 408 – Stilicho, Roman general (b. 359)
1155 – Emperor Konoe of Japan (b. 1139)
1241 – Pope Gregory IX, (b. 1143)
1280 – Pope Nicholas III (b. 1225)
1304 – John II, Count of Holland (b. 1247)
1338 – William II, Duke of Athens (b. 1312)
1350 – Philip VI of France (b. 1293)
1358 – Isabella of France (b. 1295)
1425 – Eleanor, Princess of Asturias (b. 1423)
1456 – Vladislav II of Wallachia
1485 – Richard III of England (b. 1452)
  1485   – James Harrington, Yorkist knight
  1485   – John Howard, 1st Duke of Norfolk (b. 1430)
  1485   – Richard Ratcliffe, supporter of Richard III
  1485   – William Brandon, supporter of Henry VII (b. 1426)
1532 – William Warham, Archbishop of Canterbury (b. 1450)
1545 – Charles Brandon, 1st Duke of Suffolk, English politician and husband of Mary Tudor (b. c. 1484)
1553 – John Dudley, 1st Duke of Northumberland, English admiral and politician, Lord President of the Council (b. 1504)
1572 – Thomas Percy, 7th Earl of Northumberland, English leader of the Rising of the North (b. 1528)
1584 – Jan Kochanowski, Polish poet and playwright (b. 1530)
1599 – Luca Marenzio, Italian singer-songwriter (b. 1553)

1601–1900
1607 – Bartholomew Gosnold, English lawyer and explorer, founded the London Company (b. 1572)
1652 – Jacob De la Gardie, Estonian-Swedish soldier and politician, Lord High Constable of Sweden (b. 1583)
1664 – Maria Cunitz, Polish astronomer and author (b. 1610)
1680 – John George II, Elector of Saxony (b. 1613)
1681 – Philippe Delano, Dutch Plymouth Colony settler (b. 1602)
1701 – John Granville, 1st Earl of Bath, English soldier and politician, Lord Lieutenant of Ireland (b. 1628)
1711 – Louis François, duc de Boufflers, French general (b. 1644)
1752 – William Whiston, English mathematician, historian, and theologian (b. 1667)
1773 – George Lyttelton, 1st Baron Lyttelton, English poet and politician, Chancellor of the Exchequer (b. 1709)
1793 – Louis de Noailles, French general (b. 1713)
1797 – Dagobert Sigmund von Wurmser, French-Austrian field marshal (b. 1724)
1806 – Jean-Honoré Fragonard, French painter and illustrator (b. 1732)
1818 – Warren Hastings, English lawyer and politician, 1st Governor-General of Bengal (b. 1732)
1828 – Franz Joseph Gall, Austrian neuroanatomist and physiologist (b. 1758)
1850 – Nikolaus Lenau, Romanian-Austrian poet and author (b. 1802)
1861 – Xianfeng, Emperor of China (b. 1831)
1888 – Ágoston Trefort, Hungarian jurist and politician, Hungarian Minister of Education (b. 1817)
1891 – Jan Neruda, Czech journalist, author, and poet (b. 1834)

1901–present
1903 – Robert Gascoyne-Cecil, 3rd Marquess of Salisbury, English academic and politician, Prime Minister of the United Kingdom (b. 1830)
1904 – Kate Chopin, American novelist and poet (b. 1850)
1909 – Henry Radcliffe Crocker, English dermatologist and author (b. 1846)
1914 – Giacomo Radini-Tedeschi, Italian bishop and academic (b. 1859)
1918 – Korbinian Brodmann, German neurologist and academic (b. 1868)
1920 – Anders Zorn, Swedish artist (b. 1860)
1922 – Michael Collins, Irish rebel, counter-intelligence and military tactician, and politician; 2nd Irish Minister of Finance (b. 1890)
1926 – Charles William Eliot, American academic (b. 1834)
1933 – Alexandros Kontoulis, Greek general and diplomat (b. 1858)
1940 – Oliver Lodge, English physicist and academic (b. 1851)
  1940   – Gerald Strickland, 1st Baron Strickland, Maltese lawyer and politician, 4th Prime Minister of Malta (b. 1861)
1942 – Michel Fokine, Russian dancer and choreographer (b. 1880)
1946 – Döme Sztójay, Hungarian general and politician, 35th Prime Minister of Hungary (b. 1883)
1950 – Kirk Bryan, American geologist and academic (b. 1888)
1951 – Jack Bickell, Canadian businessman and philanthropist (b. 1884)
1953 – Jim Tabor, American baseball player (b. 1916)
1958 – Roger Martin du Gard, French novelist and paleographer, Nobel Prize laureate (b. 1881)
1960 – Johannes Sikkar, Estonian soldier and politician, Prime Minister of Estonia in exile (b. 1897)
1963 – William Morris, 1st Viscount Nuffield, English businessman and philanthropist, founded Morris Motors (b. 1877)
1967 – Gregory Goodwin Pincus, American biologist and academic, co-created the birth-control pill (b. 1903)
1970 – Vladimir Propp, Russian philologist and scholar (b. 1895)
1974 – Jacob Bronowski, Polish-English mathematician, biologist, and author (b. 1908)
1976 – Gina Bachauer, Greek pianist and composer (b. 1913)
  1976   – Juscelino Kubitschek, Brazilian physician and politician, 21st President of Brazil (b. 1902)
1977 – Sebastian Cabot, English actor (b. 1918)
  1977   – Chunseong, Korean monk, philosopher and writer (b. 1891)
1978 – Jomo Kenyatta, Kenyan journalist and politician, 1st President of Kenya (b. 1894)
1979 – James T. Farrell, American novelist, short-story writer, and poet (b. 1904)
1980 – James Smith McDonnell, American pilot, engineer, and businessman, founded McDonnell Aircraft (b. 1899)
1981 – Vicente Manansala, Filipino painter (b. 1910)
1985 – Charles Gibson (historian), Historian of Mexico and its Indians, President of the American Historical Association (b. 1920)
1986 – Celâl Bayar, Turkish lawyer and politician, 3rd President of Turkey (b. 1883)
1987 – Joseph P. Lash, American author and journalist (b. 1909)
1989 – Robert Grondelaers, Belgian cyclist (b. 1933)
  1989   – Huey P. Newton, American activist, co-founded the Black Panther Party (b. 1942)
1991 – Colleen Dewhurst, Canadian-American actress (b. 1924)
  1991   – Boris Pugo, Russian soldier and politician, Soviet Minister of Interior (b. 1937)
1994 – Gilles Groulx, Canadian director and screenwriter (b. 1931)
  1994   – Allan Houser, American sculptor and painter (b. 1914)
1995 – Johnny Carey, Irish footballer and manager (b. 1919)
1996 – Erwin Komenda, Austrian car designer and engineer (b. 1904)
2000 – Abulfaz Elchibey, 2nd President of Azerbaijan (b. 1938)
2003 – Arnold Gerschwiler, Swiss figure skater and coach (b. 1914)
2004 – Konstantin Aseev, Russian chess player and trainer (b. 1960)
  2004   – Angus Bethune, Australian soldier and politician, 33rd Premier of Tasmania (b. 1908)
  2004   – Daniel Petrie, Canadian director and producer (b. 1920)
2005 – Luc Ferrari, French-Italian director and composer (b. 1929)
  2005   – Ernest Kirkendall, American chemist and metallurgist (b. 1914)
2007 – Grace Paley, American short story writer and poet (b. 1922)
2008 – Gladys Powers, English-Canadian soldier (b. 1899)
2009 – Muriel Duckworth, Canadian pacifist, feminist, and activist (b. 1908)
  2009   – Elmer Kelton, American journalist and author (b. 1926)
2010 – Stjepan Bobek, Croatian footballer and manager (b. 1923)
2011 – Nick Ashford, American singer-songwriter and producer (b. 1942)
  2011   – Jack Layton, Canadian academic and politician (b. 1950)
  2011   – Casey Ribicoff, American philanthropist (b. 1922)
2012 – Nina Bawden, English author (b. 1925)
  2012   – Paul Shan Kuo-hsi, Chinese cardinal (b. 1923)
  2012   – Jeffrey Stone, American actor and screenwriter (b. 1926)
2013 – Paul Poberezny, American pilot and businessman, founded the Experimental Aircraft Association (b. 1921)
  2013   – Andrea Servi, Italian footballer (b. 1984)
2014 – U. R. Ananthamurthy, Indian author, poet, and playwright (b. 1932)
  2014   – Emmanuel Kriaras, Greek lexicographer and philologist (b. 1906)
  2014   – Pete Ladygo, American football player and coach (b. 1928)
  2014   – Noella Leduc, American baseball player (b. 1933)
  2014   – John Sperling, American businessman, founded the University of Phoenix (b. 1921)
  2014   – John S. Waugh, American chemist and academic (b. 1929)
2015 – Arthur Morris, Australian cricketer and journalist (b. 1922)
  2015   – Ieng Thirith, Cambodian academic and politician (b. 1932)
  2015   – Eric Thompson, English race car driver and book dealer (b. 1919)
2016 – S. R. Nathan, 6th President of Singapore (b. 1924)
  2016   – Toots Thielemans, Belgian and American jazz musician (b. 1922)
2017 – Michael J. C. Gordon, British Computer scientist (b. 1948)
2018 – Ed King, American musician (b. 1949)
  2018   – Krishna Reddy, Indian printmaker, sculptor and teacher (b. 1925)
2021 – Rod Gilbert, Canadian ice hockey player (b. 1941)

Holidays and observances 
 Christian feast day:
Fabrizio
Guinefort, the holy greyhound, feast day traditionally.
Immaculate Heart of Mary (Roman Catholic calendar of 1960)
Queenship of Mary
Symphorian and Timotheus
August 22 (Eastern Orthodox liturgics)
 Earliest day on which National Heroes' Day (Philippines) can fall, while August 28 is the latest; celebrated on the fourth Monday in August.
Flag Day (Russia)
Madras Day (Chennai and Tamil Nadu, India)
End of Filseta feast in the Ethiopian Orthodox Tewahedo and Eritrean Orthodox Tewahedo Church
International Day Commemorating the Victims of Acts of Violence Based on Religion or Belief (International)

References

External links

 
 
 

Days of the year
August